Sukaphaa, also Siu-Ka-Pha, the first Ahom king in medieval Assam, was the founder of the Ahom kingdom and the architect of Assam. A prince of the Su/Tsu (Tiger) clan of the Mao-Shan sub-tribe originally from present-day Mong Mao, Yunnan Province, China, the kingdom he established in 1228 existed for nearly six hundred years and in the process unified the various ethnic groups of the region that left a deep impact on the region.  In reverence to his position in Assam's history the honorific Chaolung is generally associated with his name (Chao: lord; Lung: great).

Since 1996 December 2 has been celebrated in Assam as the Sukaphaa Divox, or Axom Divox (Assam Day), to commemorate the advent of the first king of the Ahom kingdom in Assam after his journey over the Patkai Hills.

Ancestry

Legend
According to Ahom tradition, Sukaphaa was a descendant of the god Khunlung, who had come down from the heavens and had ruled Mong-Ri-Mong-Ram. During the reign of Suhungmung, which saw the composition of the first Assamese chronicles.Sukaphaa brings a divine diamond chum-Phra-rung-sheng-mung in a box, a divine tusked elephant, a divine chicken Kaichengmung, a divine embroidered cloth, a divine pair of drums, a divine sword Hengdan.

Prince of Mong Mao
The details of Sukaphaa's life and origins before his entry into Assam, available from different chronicles, both Ahom and non-Ahom, are full of contradictions. According to  who has tried to hold up a consistent account, Sukaphaa was born to Chao Chang-Nyeu (alias Phu-Chang-Khang) and Nang-Mong Blak-Kham-Sen in the Tai state of Mong Mao (also called Mao-Lung, with the capital at Kieng Sen), close to present-day Ruili in Yunnan, China. Chao Chang Nyeu was a prince from Mong-Ri Mong-Ram, who had traveled to Mong Mao possibly on an expedition. Mong Mao was then ruled by Chao Tai Pung. Chao Chang Nyeu was later befriended by Pao Meo Pung, the son of the ruler, who gave his sister Blak Kham Sen in marriage. Sukaphaa was born of this union not later than 1189 CE and was brought up by his maternal grandparents. Pao Meo Pung, who eventually ruled Mong Mao, had no male heir and Sukaphaa, his nephew, was nominated to succeed him. A son born late to Pao Meo Pung's queen ended Sukaphaa's claim to the throne of Mong Mao.

Departure from Mong Mao
After his 19 years as crown prince came to an end, Sukaphaa decided to leave Mong Mao. According to tradition, his grandmother advised him thus - "no two tigers live in the same jungle, no two kings sit on the same throne." Accordingly, Sukaphaa is said to have left Chieng-Sen the capital of Mong Mao in the year 1215 CE.

Journey into Assam
Sukaphaa left Mong Mao in 1215. He was accompanied by three queens, two sons and a daughter; chiefs from five other dependent Mongs; members of the priestly class and soldiers—a total contingent of 9,000. Some commoners are recorded as having joined this core group on the way. Sukaphaa had with him 300 horses fitted with saddles and bridles and two elephants. Heavy arms were transported along a different route. Sukaphaa followed an older known route from Yunnan to Assam that passed through Myitkyina, Mogaung and the upper Irrawaddy river valley. On his way he stopped at various places and crossed the Khamjang river to reach the Nangyang lake in 1227. Here he subjugated the Nagas very ferociously and established a Mong. He left one Kan-Khrang-Mong there to guard the passage back, and proceeded to cross the Patkai hills at the Pangsau pass and reached Namrup (in the Brahmaputra valley) in December 1228.  The journey, from Mong Mao to Namrup thus took Sukaphaa about thirteen years and the year he reached Namrup is considered as the year the Ahom kingdom was established.

Sukapha in Assam
Sukapha came into Assam not as a raiding conqueror but as a head  of an agriculture folk in search of land. It appear he didn't encroach upon the land of peasants, rather he opened up new areas for settlement, procuring with shrewd diplomacy what he direly needed for the purpose- the service of the local inhabitants: Come and have mutual introduction with us.You are the host, the natives of this land: we are guests coming from an up-country. You should introduce to us the local people. His appeal had the desired effectand the tribes were subsequently won over.
Sukapha moved and lived amongst the tribesman, learnt their languages, honoured their religious rites, married their daughters and led a simple life of a commoner, himself cultivating in the land. He accepted them to his social fold, placed them on equal footing with his own men and treated them as his friends.

Establishing the Ahom kingdom

Over the next few years, he moved from place to place searching for the right capital, leaving behind his representative at each stage to rule the colonized land.  Then he went up the Burhidihing river and established a province at Lakhen Telsa.  Then he came back down the river and established his rule at Tipam. In 1236 he moved to Mungklang (Abhoipur), and in 1240 down the Brahmaputra to Habung (Dhemaji).  In 1244 he went further down to Ligirigaon (Song-Tak), a few miles from present-day Nazira, and in 1246 to Simaluguri (Tun Nyeu), a place downstream from the present-day Simaluguri. Finally in 1253 he built himself his capital city at Charaideo near present-day Sibsagar town.  The capital of the Ahom kingdom changed many times after this, but Charaideo remained the symbolic center of Ahom rule.

With the help of local recruits, he established three large farms for sali rice cultivation, called Barakhowakhat, Engerakhat and Gachikalakhat''.

In 1268 Sukaphaa died.  At the time of his death, his kingdom was bounded by the Brahmaputra River in the west, the Disang River in the north, the Dikhow River in the south and the Naga Hills in the east.

Even though Sukaphaa treated the people of the Patkai hills very severely on his way to the Brahmaputra valley, his approach to the population in Assam was conciliatory and non-confrontational.  He married the daughters of Badaucha, the Moran Chief and Thakumatha, the Barahi chief and established cordial relations with them.  As he began establishing his domain, he avoided regions that were heavily populated.  He encouraged his soldiers as well as members of the Ahom elite to marry locally.  A process of Ahomisation (whereby locals who adopted Ahom methods of wet rice cultivation and statecraft were accepted into the Ahom fold) bolstered the process of integration. The local Borahi and the Moran people, speakers of Tibeto-Burman languages, addressed Sukaphaa's people as "Ha-Cham", that later on developed into "Assam" or "Ahom" (see Etymology of Assam), the name of the kingdom; and "Ahom", the name of the people.

Memorial
 December 2, Assam celebrates as the Sukaphaa Divas, or Asom Divas (Assam Day). An award is given by State Govt. that day to a prominent personality.
 Sukapha Samannay Kshetra : Inaugurated on December 2, 2015, at Mohbondha, Jorhat.
A 100-feet long statue of Chaolung Siu Ka Pha was unveiled in Nazira, Assam on February 26, 2021 by Assam Health, Finance and Education Minister Dr. Himanta Biswa Sarma. It stirred controversy because of its "weird looking" face. 
 Sukaphaa Bhawan at Khanapara, Guwahati
 Sukaphaa Bhawan at Borbaruah, Dibrugarh.
 A cruise in the name of RV Sukafa plying on Brahmaputra.

See also
 Ahom Dynasty
 Ahom kingdom
 Kingdom of Pong

Notes

References

External links
 Siu-Ka-Pha – a great visionary An article by Babul Tamuli published in The Assam Tribune on the occasion of Siu-Ka-Pha Divas.
 Siukapha–an epitome of harmony An article by Dr Sikhamoni Konwar published in The Assam Tribune on the occasion of Siu-Ka-Pha/Assam Divas on 2 December 2008.

Ahom kings
1189 births
1268 deaths
History of Assam
Ahom kingdom
13th-century Tai people
12th-century Tai people